The yellow-spotted keelback (Fowlea flavipunctata) is a species of colubrid snake found in
India, Myanmar, Thailand, China, West Malaysia, Laos, Cambodia, Vietnam, Indonesia (Sumatra, Java, and Kalimantan) Its type locality is:  Island of Hong Kong (Hong Kong) and Canton River?, China.

IUCN includes Taiwan in the range of F. flavipunctata, but excludes India, Malaysia, and Indonesia.

F. f. schnurrenbergeri of Nepal is now considered an independent species, Fowlea schnurrenbergeri.

Habitat and behaviour
F. flavipunctata is a semiaquatic snake that occurs in slow rivers and streams, marshes, swamps, ponds, and lakes. It thrives also in wet human-modified habitats, including rice fields and ditches. It feeds on fish and frogs. It is diurnal.

Relations with humans
F. flavipunctata is exploited in parts of its range to support snake farms and pigs and for use in snake wine.

References

 Hallowell, E.; 1861 "Report upon the Reptilia of the North Pacific Exploring Expedition, under command of Capt. John Rogers, U.S.N." Proc. Acad. Nat. Sci. Philadelphia 12 [1860]: 480 - 510

Fowlea
Reptiles of Cambodia
Reptiles of China
Reptiles of Laos
Reptiles of Taiwan
Reptiles of Thailand
Reptiles of Vietnam
Reptiles described in 1860
Taxa named by Edward Hallowell (herpetologist)